Felicia Candelario (born 17 January 1961) is a Dominican Republic sprinter. She competed in the women's 100 metres at the 1984 Summer Olympics.

References

External links
 

1961 births
Living people
Athletes (track and field) at the 1979 Pan American Games
Athletes (track and field) at the 1983 Pan American Games
Athletes (track and field) at the 1984 Summer Olympics
Dominican Republic female sprinters
Olympic athletes of the Dominican Republic
Pan American Games competitors for the Dominican Republic
World Athletics Championships athletes for the Dominican Republic
Place of birth missing (living people)
Olympic female sprinters